Edge of Night (Greek:Αυτή η νύχτα μένει/Afti i nyhta menei) is a Greek film directed by Nikos Panayotopoulos. The film released on 7 January 2000 and stars Nikos Kouris and Athina Maximou. It won six awards in Greek State Film Awards.

Plot
Stella is a beautiful young woman with a talent in singing. She dreams of doing one day a big career in singing. Andreas, her boyfriend who works in a small store, doesn't approve her dreams and as consequence there are quarrels between them. When Stella decides to go in the north Greece to sing in night clubs, Andreas sets off to find her, wandered in the places of night fun. Soon Stella is disappointed by the people of nightlife and returns to Andreas.

Cast
Nikos Kouris as Andreas
Athina Maximou as Stella
Zoi Nalbanti as Tzina
Kostas Markopoulos as boxer

Reception
winner:  
2000: Greek State Film Awards for best actress (Athina Maximou)
2000: Greek State Film Awards for best supporting actress (Zoe Nalbanti)
2000: Greek State Film Awards for best music (Stamatis Kraounakis)
2000: Greek State Film Awards for best sound
2000: Greek State Film Awards for best set decoration
2000: Greek State Film Awards for best film (second place)

nominated:
2000:Cairo International Film Festival for Golden Pyramid

References

External links

2000 films
Greek romantic drama films
2000s Greek-language films
Greek musical films